Amyntas B.C., commonly known as Amyntas, is a Greek professional basketball club. The club's full name is Athlitikos Omilos Amyntas Ymittos B.C. The club is located in Dafni-Ymittos, Dafni, a suburb of Athens, Greece. The colors of the team are blue and orange. The club is named after the father of Philip II of Macedon, and grandfather of Alexander the Great, Amyntas III of Macedon. The club's emblem is King Amyntas.

History
Amyntas B.C. was originally founded in 1950. In 2010, Dafni and A.O. Amyntas merged, creating A.O. Amyntas Dafnis - Ymittos. The club then competed in the 2nd-tier level Greek A2 Basket League, during the 2010–11 season. After that, the two clubs separated again.

Arena
Amyntas plays its home games at the 600 seat Pyrkal Ymittos Indoor Hall.

Roster

Notable players

Dimitris Cheilaris
Spyros Diamantopoulos
Periklis Dorkofikis
Ioannis Karamalegkos
Dimitrios Lolas
Costas Rigas
Christos Zoupas

External links
Official Team Website 
Eurobasket.com Team Profile

Basketball teams established in 1950
Basketball teams in Greece